Tanuku Municipality is the local self government in Tanuku, a Town in the Indian state of Andhra Pradesh. It is classified as a first grade municipality.

History 
Mullapudi Harischandra Prasad was the first chairman of Tanuku.  After So Many Municipal Chairman'S Of Tanuku Was Going Generation. Tanuku Town Municipality.

Last Term Municipal Chairman Was

( Parimi Venkatesulu )

Son/Of ( Parimi Krupavaram)

Administration 
The municipality was constituted in 1979 and the urban local body is classified as a first grade municipality. The present municipal commissioner of the city is Mr.Gorantla Sambasiva Rao and the chairperson is SS REDDY GARU.

Tanuku Municipal Chairman - Ss Reddy Ysrcp

Civic works and services
Tanuku is one of the municipality to be a part of energy conservation project, in coordination with Energy Efficiency Services Limited (EESL), under Union Ministry of Power.

See also 
 List of municipalities in Andhra Pradesh

References 

1979 establishments in Andhra Pradesh
Government agencies established in 1979
Municipal Councils in Andhra Pradesh